Russell's Shorts is the second studio album of the Canadian comedy music group The Arrogant Worms. It was released in 1994.  "Having Fun Is Bad For You", "A Night In Dildo", and "Losing Hair Under God" were recorded live.

"Carrot Juice Is Murder" received airplay on Dr. Demento's syndicated radio show, and as a result, became the number one requested song of 1995 on that show.   It was later included on the Dr. Demento's 30th Anniversary Collection: Dementia 2000! compilation.

Track listing

References

1994 albums
The Arrogant Worms albums